Tsoanelo Pholo (born 13 December 1982 in Johannesburg) is a field hockey player from South Africa, who was a member of the national squad that finished 9th at the 2004 Summer Olympics in Athens.

She was born in Maseru, Lesotho and later moved to Johannesburg where she still resides. and she is nicknamed Coach. Pholo played for a provincial team called Southern Gauteng. She was recruited to represent South Africa in the touch rugby World Cup in 1999. She also played soccer. After her retirement from playing international hockey, Pholo pursued her coaching ambitions.

Coach Pholo is an FIH (International Hockey Federation) Level 4 Accredited Field Hockey coach & FIH Coach Educator. She is head coach of the women's 1st team at the University of Johannesburg, head coach of the Southern Gauteng provincial Junior (Under 21) team, and she coached the South African team which won the 2018 African Youth Games in Algiers, Algeria and were semi-finalists at the 2018 Youth Olympic Games in Buenos Aires, Argentina.

She is the striker coach for the South Africa men's national field hockey team.

International senior tournaments
 2003 – All Africa Games (Abuja, Nigeria)
 2004 – Olympic Games (Athens, Greece) 
 2005 – Champions Challenge (Virginia Beach, United States)
 2006 – World Cup (Madrid, Spain)
 2007 – World Cup (Vienna, Austria)

References

External links
 
 
 

1982 births
Living people
South African female field hockey players
South African field hockey coaches
Olympic field hockey players of South Africa
Field hockey players at the 2004 Summer Olympics
Field hockey players from Johannesburg
African Games gold medalists for South Africa
Competitors at the 2003 All-Africa Games
African Games medalists in field hockey